Lisa Iwamoto is an American architect, educator, and author. She is the founding partner of IwamotoScott, an architecture firm based in San Francisco, California. Iwamoto is an associate professor at the University of California, Berkeley and the author of Digital Fabrications: Architectural and Material Techniques published by Princeton Architectural Press. 

Iwamoto graduated from the University of Colorado Boulder and the Harvard Graduate School of Design. In 2018, she was named as one of five winners of the fifth annual Women in Architecture awards by Architectural Record. In 2021, Iwamoto was appointed as the Architecture Chair at the UC Berkeley College of Environmental Design.

References

External links 
 Iwamoto, Lisa, and Craig Scott. “Surface / Thickness Translated: Design-Build as Vehicle.” Journal of Architectural Education 54, no. 3 (February 1, 2001): 185–90. 
 Hill, Sophie. In Conversation: Lisa Iwamoto. Interview by Dr. Sofia Colabella, April 16, 2021. https://msd.unimelb.edu.au/study/discover/in-conversation-lisa-iwamoto.
 Iwamoto, Lisa. 2011. “Line Array: Protocells as Dynamic Structure.” Architectural Design 81 (2): 111–21. 

Living people
University of Colorado Boulder alumni
Harvard Graduate School of Design alumni
UC Berkeley College of Environmental Design faculty
American women architects
Year of birth missing (living people)
American people of Japanese descent
American academics of Japanese descent